Horseshoe Falls is the largest of the three waterfalls that collectively form Niagara Falls on the Niagara River along the Canada–United States border. Approximately 90% of the Niagara River, after diversions for hydropower generation, flows over Horseshoe Falls. The remaining 10% flows over American Falls and Bridal Veil Falls. It is located between Terrapin Point on Goat Island in the US state of New York, and Table Rock in the Canadian province of Ontario.

International border

When the boundary line between the United States and Canada was determined in 1819, based on the Treaty of Ghent, the northeastern end of the Horseshoe Falls was in New York, United States, flowing around the Terrapin Rocks, which were once connected to Goat Island by a series of bridges. In 1955, the area between the rocks and Goat Island was filled in, creating Terrapin Point. In the early 1980s the United States Army Corps of Engineers filled in more land and built diversion dams and retaining walls to force the water away from Terrapin Point. Altogether,  of the Horseshoe Falls was eliminated. Due to erosion, the falls will continue to move in relation to the boundary line in the future.

The official national maps for both Canada and the United States indicate that a small portion of the Horseshoe Falls is located within the United States.

Gallery

See also
 Niagara Parks Commission
 American Falls
 Bridal Veil Falls (Niagara Falls)
 Iroquois mythology

References

Niagara Falls
Waterfalls of Ontario
Waterfalls of New York (state)
Tourist attractions in Niagara Falls, Ontario
Block waterfalls
Landforms of Niagara County, New York
Protected areas of Niagara County, New York
Plunge waterfalls
Niagara Falls State Park